The Pringle of Scotland Tournament was a golf tournament played from 1964 to 1967 in the United Kingdom. The sponsor was clothing company Pringle of Scotland. The total prize money was £4,000.

Pringle of Scotland sponsored the PGA Seniors Championship from 1969 to 1974.

Winners

References

External links
Results at where2golf.com

Golf tournaments in the United Kingdom
Recurring sporting events established in 1964
1964 establishments in the United Kingdom
1967 disestablishments in the United Kingdom